Islamism (also often called political Islam or Islamic fundamentalism) is a religio-political ideology. There is no consensus definition of Islamism, which has many varieties and alternative names.   The use of the term is objected to by some as derogatory and by others as so broad and flexible as to have lost its meaning. In its original formulation, Islamism described an ideology seeking to revive Islam to its past assertiveness and glory,  
purifying it of foreign elements, reasserting its role into “social and political as well as personal life"; and in particular 
“reordering government and society in accordance with laws prescribed by Islam" (aka Sharia). 
  According to at least one observer (author Robin Wright), Islamist movements have "arguably altered the Middle East more than any trend since the modern states gained independence", redefining "politics and even borders".

Central and prominent figures in 20th-century Islamism include Sayyid Rashid Rida, Hassan al-Banna (founder of the Muslim Brotherhood), Sayyid Qutb,  Abul A'la Maududi, Ruhollah Khomeini (founder of the Islamic Republic of Iran), Hassan Al-Turabi.

Al-Banna and Maududi called for a "reformist" strategy to re-Islamizing society through grassroots social and political activism.  Other Islamists (Al-Turabi) have advocated a "revolutionary" strategy of Islamizing society through exercise of state power, or for combining grassroots Islamization with violent revolution (Sayyid Qutb). The term  has been applied to  non-state reform movements, political parties, militias and revolutionary groups.  Islamists emphasize the implementation of sharia, pan-Islamic political unity, the creation of Islamic states, (eventually unified), and rejection of non-Muslim influences—particularly Western or universal economic, military, political, social, or cultural.

At least one author (Graham E. Fuller) has argued for a broader notion of Islamism as a form of identity politics, involving "support for [Muslim] identity, authenticity, broader regionalism, revivalism, [and] revitalization of the community." 
Islamists themselves prefer terms such as "Islamic movement",
or "Islamic activism"  to "Islamism", objecting to the insinuation that Islamism is anything other than Islam  renewed and revived.  In public and academic contexts, the term "Islamism" has been criticized as having been given connotations of violence, extremism, and  violations of human rights, by the Western mass media, leading to Islamophobia and stereotyping.

Following the Arab Spring, many post-Islamist currents became heavily involved in democratic politics, while others spawned "the most aggressive and ambitious Islamist militia" to date, such as the Islamic State of Iraq and the Levant (ISIL).

Terminology
Originally the term Islamism was simply used to mean the religion of Islam, not an ideology or movement. It first appeared in the English language as Islamismus in 1696, and as Islamism in 1712.  The term appears in the U.S. Supreme Court decision in In Re Ross (1891). By the turn of the twentieth century the shorter and purely Arabic term "Islam" had begun to  displace it, and by 1938, when Orientalist scholars completed The Encyclopaedia of Islam, Islamism seems to have virtually disappeared from English usage. The term remained  "practically absent from the vocabulary" of scholars, writers or journalists until the Iranian Islamic Revolution of 1978–79, which brought  Ayatollah Khomeini's concept of "Islamic government" to Iran.

Definitions
Islamism has been defined as:
 "the belief that Islam should guide social and political as well as personal life" (Sheri Berman);
 the belief that Islam should influence political systems (Cambridge English Dictionary);
 "the [Islamic] ideology that guides society as a whole and that [teaches] law must be in conformity with the Islamic sharia", (W E. Shepard);
 a form of "religionized politics" and an instance of religious fundamentalism that imagines an Islamic community claiming global hegemony for its values (Bassam Tibi);
 "political movement that favors reordering government and society in accordance with laws prescribed by Islam" (Associated Press stylebook)
 a political ideology which seeks to enforce Islamic precepts and norms as generally applicable rules for people's conduct; and whose adherents seek a state based on Islamic values and laws (sharia) and rejecting Western guiding principles, such as freedom of opinion, freedom of the press, artistic freedom and freedom of religion (Thomas Volk);
  a broad set of political ideologies that utilize and draw inspiration from Islamic symbols and traditions in pursuit of a sociopolitical objective—also called "political Islam" (Britannica);
 "[... has become shorthand for] 'Muslims we don't like.'" (Council on American–Islamic Relations—in complaint about AP's earlier definition of Islamist) 
In  "Western popular discourse generally uses 'Islamism' when discussing the negative or 'that-which-is-bad' in Muslim communities. The signifier, 'Islam,' on the other hand, is reserved for the positive or neutral." (David Belt);
 a movement so broad and flexible it reaches out to "everything to everyone" in Islam, making it "unsustainable" (Tarek Osman);
 an alternative social provider to the poor masses;
 an angry platform for the disillusioned young;
 a loud trumpet-call announcing "a return to the pure religion" to those seeking an identity;
 a "progressive, moderate religious platform" for the affluent and liberal;
 ... and at the extremes, a violent vehicle for rejectionists and radicals.
 an Islamic "movement that seeks cultural differentiation from the West and reconnection with the pre-colonial symbolic universe", (François Burgat);
 "the active assertion and promotion of beliefs, prescriptions, laws or policies that are held to be Islamic in character," (International Crisis Group);
 a movement of "Muslims who draw upon the belief, symbols, and language of Islam to inspire, shape, and animate political activity;" which may contain moderate, tolerant, peaceful activists or those who "preach intolerance and espouse violence", (Robert H. Pelletreau);
 "All who seek to Islamize their environment, whether in relation to their lives in society, their family circumstances, or the workplace ...", (Roy Olivier).

Overview

Relationship between Islam and Islamism

The relationship between Islam and the notions of Islamism has been a source of disagreement, with Islamists simply seeing their movement as a  corrected version or a revival of Islam, while others denounce or dismiss Islamism as a modern deviation from Islam.

At least one observer (a writer for the International Crisis Group) maintains that "the conception of 'political Islam'" is a creation of Americans to explain the Iranian Islamic Revolution, ignoring the fact that (according to them) Islam is by definition political.   In fact it is quietist/non-political Islam, not Islamism, that requires explanation, which the author gives—calling it  
an historical fluke of the "short-lived era of the heyday of secular Arab nationalism between 1945 and 1970".

Hayri Abaza argues that the failure to distinguish Islam from Islamism leads many in the West to equate the two; they think that by  supporting illiberal Islamic (Islamist) regimes, they are being respectful of Islam, to the detriment of those who seek to separate religion from politics.

Another source distinguishes Islamist from Islamic by emphasizing the fact that Islam "refers to a religion and culture in existence over a millennium", whereas Islamism "is a political/religious phenomenon linked to the great events of the 20th century". Islamists have, at least at times, defined themselves as "Islamiyyoun/Islamists" to differentiate themselves from "Muslimun/Muslims". Daniel Pipes describes Islamism as a modern ideology that owes more to European utopian political ideologies and "isms" than to the traditional Islamic religion.

Influence
Few observers contest the immense influence of Islamism within the Muslim world. Following the collapse of the Soviet Union, political movements based on the liberal ideology of free expression and democratic rule have led the opposition in other parts of the world such as Latin America, Eastern Europe and many parts of Asia; however "the simple fact is that political Islam currently reigns [circa 2002-3] as the most powerful ideological force across the Muslim world today".

Some Western political scientists see the unchanging socio-economic condition in the Muslim world as a major factor. Olivier Roy believes "the socioeconomic realities that sustained the Islamist wave are still here and are not going to change: poverty, uprootedness, crises in values and identities, the decay of the educational systems, the North-South opposition, and the problem of immigrant integration into the host societies".

The strength of Islamism also draws from the strength of religiosity in general in the Muslim world. Compared to other societies around the globe, "[w]hat is striking about the Islamic world is that ... it seems to have been the least penetrated by irreligion". Where other peoples may look to the physical or social sciences for answers in areas which their ancestors regarded as best left to scripture, in the Muslim world, religion has become more encompassing, not less, as "in the last few decades, it has been the fundamentalists who have increasingly represented the cutting edge" of Muslim culture.

Writing in 2009, German journalist Sonja Zekri described Islamists in Egypt and other Muslim countries as "extremely influential. ... They determine how one dresses, what one eats. In these areas, they are incredibly successful. ... Even if the Islamists never come to power, they have transformed their countries." Political Islamists were described as "competing in the democratic public square in places like Turkey, Tunisia, Malaysia and Indonesia".

Types

Islamism takes different forms and spans a wide range of strategies and tactics towards the powers in place—"destruction, opposition, collaboration, indifference" that have varied as "circumstances have changed"p. 54
—and thus is not a united movement.

Moderate and reformist Islamists who accept and work within the democratic process include parties like the Tunisian Ennahda Movement.   
Jamaat-e-Islami of Pakistan is basically a socio-political and  Vanguard party working with in Pakistan's Democratic political process, but has also gained political influence through military coup d'états in the past. Other Islamist groups like Hezbollah in Lebanon and Hamas in Palestine participate in the democratic and political process as well as armed attacks by their powerful paramilitary wing. Jihadist organizations like al-Qaeda and the Egyptian Islamic Jihad, and groups such as the Taliban, entirely reject democracy, seeing it as a form of kufr, calling for offensive jihad on a religious basis.

Another major division within Islamism is between what Graham E. Fuller has described as the conservative "guardians of the tradition" (Salafis, such as those in the Wahhabi movement) and the revolutionary "vanguard of change and Islamic reform" centered around the Muslim Brotherhood. Olivier Roy argues that "Sunni pan-Islamism underwent a remarkable shift in the second half of the 20th century" when the Muslim Brotherhood movement and its focus on Islamisation of pan-Arabism was eclipsed by the Salafi movement with its emphasis on "sharia rather than the building of Islamic institutions". Following the Arab Spring, Roy has described Islamism as "increasingly interdependent" with democracy in much of the Arab Muslim world, such that "neither can now survive without the other."  While Islamist political culture itself may not be democratic, Islamists need democratic elections to maintain their legitimacy. At the same time, their popularity is such that no government can call itself democratic that excludes mainstream Islamist groups.

Circa 2017, arguing distinctions between “radical/moderate” or “violent/peaceful” Islamism were "simplistic", scholar Morten Valbjørn put forth these "much more sophisticated typologies" of Islamism:

Moderate and reformist Islamism

Throughout the 80s and 90s, major moderate Islamist movements such as the Muslim Brotherhood and the Ennahda were excluded from democratic political participation. At least in part for that reason, Islamists attempted to overthrow the government in the Algerian Civil War (1991–2002) and  terror campaign in Egypt during in the 90s. These attempts were crushed and in the 21st century, Islamists turned increasingly to non-violent methods,  and  "moderate Islamists" now make up the majority of the contemporary Islamist movements.

Among some Islamists,  Democracy has been harmonized with Islam by means of Shura (i.e. consultation). The tradition of consultation by the ruler being considered Sunnah of the prophet Muhammad, (Majlis-ash-Shura being a common name for legislative bodies in Islamic countries). 

Among the varying goals, strategies, and outcomes of "moderate Islamist movements" are a formal abandonment of their original vision of implementing sharia (also termed Post-Islamism) -- done by the Ennahda Movement of Tunisia, and Prosperous Justice Party (PKS) of Indonesia.  Others, such as the National Congress of Sudan, have implemented the sharia with the foreign support from the conservative states (Saudi Arabia).

According to one concept -- "inclusion-moderation theory" --  the interdependence of political outcome with goal and strategy means  that the more moderate the Islamists become, the more likely they are to be politically included (or unsuppressed); and the more accommodating the government is, the less "extreme" Islamists become.  A prototype of  harmonizing Islamist principles within the modern state framework was the "Turkish model", based on the rule of the Turkish Justice and Development Party (AKP) led by Recep Tayyip Erdoğan Turkish model, however, has been considered came "unstuck" after recent purge and violations of democratic principles by the Erdoğan regime. Critics of the concept, who include other democracy-rejecting Islamists, hold that Islamist aspirations are fundamentally incompatible with the democratic principles.

Salafi movement

The contemporary Salafi movement is sometimes described as a variety of Islamism and sometimes as a different school of Islam, such as a "phase between fundamentalism and Islamism".
Originally a reformist movement of Jamal al-Din al-Afghani,  Muhammad Abdul, and Rashid Rida, that rejected maraboutism, the established schools of fiqh, and demanded individual interpretation (ijtihad) of the Quran and Sunnah; it evolved into a movement embracing the conservative  doctrines  of the medieval Hanbali theologian Ibn Taymiyyah. While it has a quietist school that advocates  societal reform through religious education and proselytizing, other salafi  are activist (or haraki) or   jihadist (Salafi jihadism, see below).  The activist school, encourages non-violent political participation within the constitutional and political framework. The jihadist school is inspired by the ideology of Sayyid Qutb (Qutbism, see below), and rejects the legitimacy of secular institutions and promotes the revolution in order to pave the way for the establishment of a new Caliphate.

The politically active Salafi school, Salafi activism believes that politics is a field which requires Salafi principles to be applied as well, in the same manner with other aspects of society and life. Salafi activism originated in the 50s to 60s Saudi Arabia, where many Muslim Brothers had taken refuge from the prosecution by the Nasser regime. There, Muslim Brothers' Islamism had synthesized with Salafism, and led to the creation of the Salafi activist trend exemplified by the Sahwa movement in the 80s, promulgated by Safar Al-Hawali and Salman al-Ouda. Today, this school makes up the majority of Salafism. There are many active Salafist political parties throughout the Muslim world, including the Al Islah Party of Yemen and Al Asalah of Bahrain.

Wahhabism

One of the antecedents of the contemporary Salafi movement is Wahhabism, which traces back to the 18th-century reform movement in Arabia by Muhammad ibn Abd al-Wahhab. Although having different roots, Wahhabism and Salafism are considered more or less merged by the 1960s in Saudi Arabia. In the process, Salafis and Wahhabis have greatly influenced each other, and today they share mostly similar religious outlooks. In effect, Wahhabism has transformed into the Saudi brand of the Salafi movement. From the political perspective, Wahhabism is marked in its teaching of bay'ah, which requires Muslims to present an allegiance to the ruler of the society. Wahhabis have traditionally given their allegiance to the House of Saud, and this has made them apolitical in Saudi Arabia. However, there are small numbers of other strains including Salafi Jihadist offshoot which decline to present an allegiance to the House of Saud. Due to their traditional monarchist stance of loyalty to the Saudi King, Wahhabi clerics discourage revolutionary themes and activities related to social justice, anticolonialism, or economic equality, expounded upon by most Islamists. Historically, Wahhabism was state-sponsored and internationally propagated by Saudi Arabia with the help of funding from mainly Saudi petroleum exports, leading to the "explosive growth" of its influence (and subsequently, the influence of Salafism) from the 70s (a phenomenon often dubbed as Petro-Islam). Today, both Wahhabism and Salafism exert their influence worldwide, and they have been indirectly contributing to the upsurge of Salafi Jihadism as well.

Militant Islamism/Jihadism

Qutbism

Qutbism is a term used by Western political scientists to refer to the Jihadist ideology formulated by Sayyid Qutb, an influential figure of the Muslim Brotherhood in Egypt during the 50s and 60s, which justifies the use of violence in order to push the Islamist goals. Based on the two concepts, Qutbism promotes engagement against the state apparatus in order to topple down its regime. Fusion of Qutbism and Salafi Movement had resulted in the development of Salafi jihadism (see below).

Qutbism is considered a product of the extreme repression experienced by Qutb and his fellow Muslim Brothers under the Nasser regime, which was resulted from an alleged 1954 Muslim Brothers plot to assassinate Nasser. During the repression, thousands of Muslim Brothers were imprisoned, many of them, including Qutb, tortured and held in concentration camps. Under this condition, Qutb had cultivated his Islamist ideology in his seminal work Ma'alim fi-l-Tariq (Milestones), in which he equated the Muslims within the Nasser regime with secularism and the West, and described the contemporary situation as beiing a state of jahiliyyah (period of time before the advent of Islam). Although Qutb was executed before the completion of his ideology, his ideas was disseminated and continuously expanded by the later generations, among them Abdullah Yusuf Azzam and Ayman Al-Zawahiri, who was a student of Qutb's brother Muhammad Qutb and later became a mentor of Osama bin Laden. Al-Zawahiri was considered "the purity of Qutb's character and the torment he had endured in prison," and had played an extensive role in the normalization of offensive Jihad within the Qutbist discourse.

Salafi Jihadism

Salafi jihadism is a term coined by Gilles Kepel in 2002, referring to the ideology which actively promotes and conducts violence and terrorism in order to pursue the establishment of an Islamic state or a new Caliphate. Today, the term is often simplified to Jihadism or Jihadist movement. It is a hybrid ideology between Qutbism, Salafism, Wahhabism and other minor Islamist strains. Qutbism taught by scholars like Abdullah Azzam provided the political intellectual underpinnings with concepts like Salafism and Wahhabism providing the religious intellectual input. Salafi Jihadism makes up a minority of the contemporary Islamist movements.

Distinct characteristics of Salafi Jihadism noted by Robin Wright include the formal process of taking bay'ah (oath of allegiance) to the leader, which is inspired by Hadiths and early Muslim practice and included in Wahhabi teaching. Another characteristic is its flexibility to cut ties with the less-popular movements when its strategically or financially convenient, exemplified by the relations between al-Qaeda and al-Nusra Front. Other marked developments of Salafi Jihadism include the concepts of "near enemy" and "far enemy". "Near enemy" connotes the despotic regime(s) occupying the Muslim society, and the term was coined by Mohammed Abdul-Salam Farag in order to justify the assassination of Anwar al-Sadat by the Salafi Jihadi organization Egyptian Islamic Jihad (EIJ) in 1981. Later, the concept of "far enemy" which connotes the West was introduced and formally declared by al-Qaeda in 1996.

Salafi Jihadism emerged during the 80s when the Soviet invaded Afghanistan. Local mujahideen had extracted financial, logistical and military support from Saudi Arabia, Pakistan and the United States. Later, Osama bin Laden established al-Qaeda as a transnational Salafi Jihadi organization in 1988 to capitalize on this financial, logistical and military network and to expand their operation. The ideology had seen its rise during the 90s when the Muslim world experienced numerous geopolitical crisis, notably the Algerian Civil War (1991–2002), Bosnian War (1992–1995), and the First Chechen War (1994–1996). Within these conflicts, political Islam often acted as a mobilizing factor for the local belligerents, who demanded financial, logistical and military support from al-Qaeda, in the exchange for active proliferation of the ideology. After the 1998 bombings of US embassies, September 11 attacks (2001), the US-led invasion of Afghanistan (2001) and Iraq (2003), Salafi Jihadism had seen its momentum. However, it got devastated by the US counterterrorism operations, culminating in bin Laden's death in 2011. After the Arab Spring (2011) and subsequent Syrian Civil War (2011–present), the remnants of al-Qaeda franchise in Iraq had restored their capacity, which rapidly developed into the Islamic State of Iraq and the Levant, spreading its influence throughout the conflict zones of MENA region and the globe.

Explanations for the growth and popularity of Islamism

Sociological and political explanations

Charitable work
Islamist movements such as the Muslim Brotherhood, "are well known for providing shelters, educational assistance, free or low cost medical clinics, housing assistance to students from out of town, student advisory groups, facilitation of inexpensive mass marriage ceremonies to avoid prohibitively costly dowry demands, legal assistance, sports facilities, and women's groups."  All this compares very favourably against incompetent, inefficient, or neglectful governments whose commitment to social justice is limited to rhetoric.

Dissatisfaction with the status quo
The Arab world—the original heart of the Muslim world—has been afflicted with economic stagnation. For example, it has been estimated that in the mid-1990s the exports of Finland, a country of five million, exceeded those of the entire Arab world of 260 million, excluding oil revenue. Strong population growth combined with economic stagnation has created urban agglomerations in Cairo, Istanbul, Tehran, Karachi, Dhaka, and Jakarta each with well over 12 million citizens, millions of them young and unemployed or underemployed. Such a demographic, alienated from the westernized ways of the urban elite, but uprooted from the comforts and more passive traditions of the villages they came from, is understandably favourably disposed to an Islamic system promising a better world—an ideology providing an "emotionally familiar basis for group identity, solidarity, and exclusion; an acceptable basis for legitimacy and authority; an immediately intelligible formulation of principles for both a critique of the present and a program for the future."

Silencing of leftist opposition
In the post-colonial era, many Muslim-majority states such as Indonesia, Egypt, Syria, and Iraq, were ruled by authoritarian regimes which were often continuously dominated by the same individuals or their cadres for decades. Simultaneously, the military played a significant part in the government decisions in many of these states (the outsized role played by the military could be seen also in democratic Turkey).

The authoritarian regimes, backed by military support, took extra measures to silence leftist opposition forces, often with the help of foreign powers. Silencing of leftist opposition deprived the masses a channel to express their economic grievances and frustration toward the lack of democratic processes.

As a result, in the post-Cold War era, civil society-based Islamist movements such as the Muslim Brotherhood were the only organizations capable to provide avenues of protest.

The dynamic is repeated after the states had gone through a democratic transition. In Indonesia, some secular political parties have contributed to the enactment of religious bylaws in order to counter the popularity of Islamist oppositions. In Egypt, during the short period of the democratic experiment, Muslim Brotherhood seized the momentum by being the most cohesive political movement among the opposition.

Ideology

Strength of identity politics

Islamism can also be described as part of identity politics, specifically the religiously oriented nationalism that emerged in the Third World in the 1970s: "resurgent Hinduism in India, Religious Zionism in Israel, militant Buddhism in Sri Lanka, resurgent Sikh nationalism in the Punjab, 'Liberation Theology' of Catholicism in Latin America, and Islamism in the Muslim world."

Islamic revival

The modern revival of Islamic devotion and the attraction to things Islamic can be traced to several events.

By the end of World War I, most Muslim states were seen to be dominated by the Christian-leaning Western states. Explanations offered were: that  the claims of Islam were false and the Christian or post-Christian West had finally come up with another system that was superior; or Islam had failed through not being true to itself. The second explanation being preferred by Muslims, a redoubling of faith and devotion by the faithful was called for to reverse this tide.

The connection between the lack of an Islamic spirit and the lack of victory was underscored by the disastrous defeat of Arab nationalist-led armies fighting Israel under the slogan "Land, Sea and Air" in the 1967 Six-Day War, compared to the (perceived) near-victory of the Yom Kippur War six years later. In that war the military's slogan was "God is Great".

Along with the Yom Kippur War came the Arab oil embargo where the (Muslim) Persian Gulf oil-producing states' dramatic decision to cut back on production and quadruple the price of oil, made the terms oil, Arabs and Islam synonymous with power throughout  the world, and especially in the Muslim world's public imagination.  Many Muslims believe as Saudi Prince Saud al Faisal did that the hundreds of billions of dollars in wealth obtained from the Persian Gulf's huge oil deposits were nothing less than a gift from God to the Islamic faithful.

As the Islamic revival gained momentum, governments such as Egypt's, which had previously repressed (and was still continuing to repress) Islamists, joined the bandwagon. They banned alcohol and flooded the airwaves with religious programming, giving the movement even more exposure.

Alienation from the West

Muslim alienation from Western ways, including its political ways.
 The memory in Muslim societies of the many centuries of "cultural and institutional success" of Islamic civilization that have created an "intense resistance to an alternative 'civilizational order'", such as Western civilization,
 The proximity of the core of the Muslim world to Europe and Christendom where it first conquered and then was conquered. Iberia in the eighth century, the Crusades which began in the eleventh century, then for centuries the Ottoman Empire, were all fields of war between Europe and Islam.

In the words of Bernard Lewis:

For almost a thousand years, from the first Moorish landing in Spain to the second Turkish siege of Vienna, Europe was under constant threat from Islam. In the early centuries it was a double threat—not only of invasion and conquest, but also of conversion and assimilation. All but the easternmost provinces of the Islamic realm had been taken from Christian rulers, and the vast majority of the first Muslims west of Iran and Arabia were converts from Christianity ... Their loss was sorely felt and it heightened the fear that a similar fate was in store for Europe.

The Islamic world felt its own anger and resentment at the much more recent technological superiority of westerners who,

are the perpetual teachers; we, the perpetual students. Generation after generation, this asymmetry has generated an inferiority complex, forever exacerbated by the fact that their innovations progress at a faster pace than we can absorb them. ... The best tool to reverse the inferiority complex to a superiority complex ... Islam would give the whole culture a sense of dignity.

For Islamists, the primary threat of the West is cultural rather than political or economic. Cultural dependency robs one of faith and identity and thus destroys Islam and the Islamic community (ummah) far more effectively than political rule.
 The end of the Cold War and Soviet occupation of Afghanistan has eliminated the common atheist Communist enemy uniting some religious Muslims and the capitalist west.

Geopolitics

State-sponsorship

Saudi Arabia

Starting in the mid-1970s the Islamic resurgence was funded by an abundance of money from Saudi Arabian oil exports. The tens of billions of dollars in "petro-Islam" largesse obtained from the recently heightened price of oil funded an estimated "90% of the expenses of the entire faith."

Throughout the Muslim world, religious institutions for people both young and old, from children's madrassas to high-level scholarships received Saudi funding,
"books, scholarships, fellowships, and mosques" (for example, "more than 1500 mosques were built and paid for with money obtained from public Saudi funds over the last 50 years"),  along with training in the Kingdom for the preachers and teachers who went on to teach and work at these universities, schools, mosques, etc.

The funding was also used to reward journalists and academics who followed the Saudis' strict interpretation of Islam; and satellite campuses were built around Egypt for Al-Azhar University, the world's oldest and most influential Islamic university.

The interpretation of Islam promoted by this funding was the strict, conservative Saudi-based Wahhabism or Salafism. In its harshest form it preached that Muslims should not only "always oppose" infidels "in every way," but "hate them for their religion ... for Allah's sake," that democracy "is responsible for all the horrible wars of the 20th century," that Shia and other non-Wahhabi Muslims were infidels, etc. While this effort has by no means converted all, or even most Muslims to the Wahhabist interpretation of Islam, it has done much to overwhelm more moderate local interpretations, and has set the Saudi-interpretation of Islam as the "gold standard" of religion in minds of some or many Muslims.

Qatar 

Though the much smaller Qatar could not provide the same level of funding as   Saudi Arabia,  it was also a petroleum exporter and also sponsored  Islamist groups.   Qatar  backed the Muslim Brotherhood in Egypt even after the 2013 overthrow of the MB regime of Mohamed Morsi, with Qatar ruler Sheikh Tamim bin Hamad Al Thani denouncing the coup. In June 2016, Mohamed Morsi was sentenced to a life sentence for passing state secrets to Qatar.

Qatar has also backed Islamist factions in Libya, Syria and Yemen.

In Libya in particular, Qatar has supported the Islamist government established in Tripoli. During the 2011 revolution that ousted President Muammar Gaddafi, Qatar provided "tens of millions of dollars in aid, military training and more than 20,000 tons of weapons" to anti-Gaddafi rebels and Islamist militias in particular. The flow of weapons was not suspended after Gaddafi's government was removed. Qatar supported cleric Ali al-Sallabi, the leader of the Islamist militia "February 17 Katiba" Ismail al-Sallabi, and the Tripoli Military Council leader Abdel Hakim Belhaj.

Hamas, in Palestine, has received considerable financial support.  hosting Hamas' politburo  since 2012; which has  met with international delegations on Qatari territory. More recently, Qatar has been accused of channeling material support to Hamas' terrorist operations under the guise of assisting Gaza reconstruction.
(Hamas politburo maintains that most of Qatar's support has been collected through charities and popular committees.)

Western support of Islamism during the Cold War

During the Cold War, particularly during the 1950s, during the 1960s, and during most of the 1970s, the U.S. and other countries in the Western Bloc occasionally attempted to take advantage of the rise of Islamic revival fervor  by directing it against leftist/communist/nationalist insurgents/adversaries, particularly against the Soviet Union and Eastern Bloc states because a part of the Communist ideology was atheistic.

During a September 1957 White House meeting between U.S. President Eisenhower and senior U.S. foreign policy officials, the president and the officials decided to use the communists' lack of religion against them by establishing a secret task force which would deliver weapons to Middle Eastern states, including Saudi Arabia. "We should do everything possible to stress the 'holy war' aspect" that has currency in the Middle East, President Eisenhower stated in agreement.

During the 1970s and sometimes later, this aid  sometimes went to fledgling Islamists and Islamist groups that later came to be seen as dangerous enemies.  The US spent billions of dollars to aid the mujahideen Muslim Afghanistan enemies of the Soviet Union, and non-Afghan veterans of the war returned home with their prestige, "experience, ideology, and weapons", and had considerable impact.

Although it is a strong opponent of Israel's existence, Hamas, officially founded in 1987, traces its origins back to institutions and clerics which were supported by Israel in the 1970s and 1980s. Israel tolerated and supported Islamist movements in Gaza, with figures like Ahmed Yassin, as Israel perceived them preferable to the secular and then more powerful al-Fatah with the PLO.

Egyptian President Anwar Sadatwhose policies included opening Egypt to Western investment (infitah); transferring Egypt's allegiance from the Soviet Union to the United States; and making peace with Israel—released Islamists from prison and welcomed home exiles in tacit exchange for political support in his struggle against leftists. His "encouraging of the emergence of the Islamist movement" was said to have been "imitated by many other Muslim leaders in the years that followed." This "gentlemen's agreement" between Sadat and Islamists broke down in 1975 but not before Islamists came to completely dominate university student unions.  Sadat was later assassinated and a formidable insurgency was formed in Egypt in the 1990s. The French government has also been reported to have promoted Islamist preachers "in the hope of channeling Muslim energies into zones of piety and charity."

History

Predecessor movements
Some Islamic revivalist movements and leaders which pre-date Islamism but share some characteristics with it include:
 Ahmad Sirhindi (~1564–1624)  was largely responsible for the purification, reassertion and revival  of conservative orthodox Sunni Islam in India during Islam's second  millennium.
 Ibn Taymiyyah, a Syrian Islamic jurist during the 13th and 14th centuries  argued against the  practices such as the celebration of Muhammad's birthday, and  seeking assistance at the grave of the Prophet.
  Muhammad ibn Abd-al-Wahhab, the founder of Wahhabism,  advocated doing away with the later religious  accretions like worship at  graves.  
 Shah Waliullah of India  was a forerunner of reformist Islamists like Muhammad Abduh, Muhammad Iqbal and Muhammad Asad in his belief that there was "a constant need for new ijtihad as the Muslim community progressed.
 Sayyid Ahmad Barelvi was a disciple and successor of Shah Waliullah's son who led a jihadist movement and attempted to create an Islamic state based on the enforcement of Islamic law.
 the Deobandi movement, founded after the defeat of the Indian Rebellion, around 1867,   led to the establishment of thousands of conservative Islamic schools or  madrasahs throughout modern-day India, Pakistan and Bangladesh.

Early history

The end of the 19th century saw the  dismemberment of most of the Muslim Ottoman Empire by non-Muslim European colonial powers,  despite the empire's spending massive sums on Western civilian and military technology to try to modernize and compete with the encroaching European powers.  In the process the Ottomans went deep into debt to these powers.

Preaching Islamic alternatives to this humiliating decline were  Jamal ad-din al-Afghani (1837–97), Muhammad Abduh (1849–1905) and Rashid Rida (1865–1935) . Muhammad Abduh and Al-Afghani formed the beginning of the early Islamist movement. Abduh's student, Rashid Rida, is widely regarded as one of "the ideological forefathers" of contemporary Islamist movements.

These  early Salafiyya,  Rashid Rida, Hassan al-Banna,and Mustafa al-Siba’i, preached that a truly Islamic society would follow sharia law,  reject taqlid, (the blind imitation of earlier authorities),    restore the Caliphate.

Sayyid Rashid Rida 

Syrian-Egyptian Islamic scholar Muhammad Rashid Rida first articulated the modern concept of an Islamic state, influencing the Muslim Brotherhood and other Sunni Islamist movements.

In his influential book al-Khilafa aw al-Imama al-'Uzma ("The Caliphate or the Grand Imamate");  Rida explained that that  societies that properly obeyed Sharia would be successful  alternatives to the disorder and injustice of both capitalism and socialism.

This society would be ruled by a Caliphate;  Sharia (Islamic laws) would be applied by the ruling Khalifa who would supervise Sharia in a partnership with the Mujtahid ulema (juristic clergy trained in Islamic jurisprudence).  They would engage in Ijtihad by evaluating scripture and govern through shura (consultation). With the Khilafa providing true Islamic governance,  Islamic civilization would be revitalised, the political and legal independence of the Muslim umma (community of Muslim believers) would be restored, and  the heretical influences of Sufism would be cleansed from Islam. This doctrine would become the blueprint of future Islamist movements.

Muhammad Iqbal

Muhammad Iqbal was a philosopher, poet and politician in British India. Though  best known as an eminent poet,
he is widely regarded as having inspired the Islamic Nationalism and Pakistan Movement in British India.

Iqbal expressed fears that not only would secularism and secular nationalism weaken the spiritual foundations of Islam and Muslim society, but that India's Hindu-majority population would crowd out Muslim heritage, culture and political influence. He was elected president of the Muslim League in 1930 and in  1932. In his Allahabad Address on 29 December 1930, Iqbal outlined a vision of an independent state for Muslim-majority provinces in northwestern India. This address later inspired the Pakistan movement.

In addition to his Pakistani activism,  in his travels to Egypt, Afghanistan, Palestine and Syria, he promoted ideas of greater Islamic political co-operation and unity, calling for the shedding of national differences

The thoughts and vision of Iqbal later influenced many reformist Islamists, e.g., Muhammad Asad, Sayyid Abul Ala Maududi and Ali Shariati.

Sayyid Abul Ala Maududi

Sayyid Abul Ala Maududi was an important early twentieth-century figure in the Islamic revival in India, and then after independence from Britain, in Pakistan. Trained as a lawyer he worked as a journalist,  and gained a wide audience with his books (translated into many languages) which placed Islam in a modern context. Maududi also founded the Jamaat-e-Islami party in 1941 and remained its leader until 1972.

Maududi believed that Muslim society could not be Islamic without Sharia, and  the establishment of an Islamic state to enforce it. The state would be based on the principles of: tawhid (unity of God), risala (prophethood) and khilafa (caliphate). Maududi was uninterested in  violence or populist policies such as came with  the Iranian Revolution, but sought the gradual changing the hearts and minds of individuals from the top of society downward through an educational process or da'wah.  Maududi believed that Islam was all-encompassing: "Everything in the universe is 'Muslim' for it obeys God by submission to His laws." "The man who denies God is called Kafir (concealer) because he conceals by his disbelief what is inherent in his nature and embalmed in his own soul."

Muslim Brotherhood

Roughly contemporaneous with Maududi was the founding of the Muslim Brotherhood in Ismailiyah, Egypt in 1928 by Hassan al Banna. His was arguably the first, largest and most influential modern Islamic political/religious organization. Under the motto "the Qur'an is our constitution,"
it sought Islamic revival through preaching and also by providing basic community services including schools, mosques, and workshops. Like Maududi, Al Banna believed in the necessity of government rule based on Shariah law implemented gradually and by persuasion, and of eliminating all Western imperialist influence in the Muslim world.

Some elements of the Brotherhood, though perhaps against orders, did engage in violence against the government, and its founder Al-Banna was assassinated in 1949 in retaliation for the assassination of Egypt's premier Mahmud Fami Naqrashi three months earlier. The Brotherhood has suffered periodic repression in Egypt and has been banned several times, in 1948 and several years later following confrontations with Egyptian president Gamal Abdul Nasser, who jailed thousands of members for several years.

The Brotherhood expanded to many other countries, becoming  one of the most influential movements in the Islamic world, particularly in the Arab world. In Egypt, despite periodic repression—for many years it was
described as "semi-legal"—it was the only opposition group in Egypt able to field candidates during elections. In the 2011–12 Egyptian parliamentary election, the political parties identified as "Islamist" (the Brotherhood's Freedom and Justice Party, Salafi Al-Nour Party and liberal Islamist Al-Wasat Party) won 75% of the total seats. Mohamed Morsi, the candidate of the Muslim Brotherhood's party, was the first democratically elected president of Egypt. However, he was deposed during the 2013 Egyptian coup d'état, after mass protests against what were perceived as undemocratic moves by him. Today, the Muslim Brotherhood is designated as a terrorist organization by Bahrain, Russia, Syria, Egypt, Saudi Arabia and the United Arab Emirates.

Sayyid Qutb (1906-1966)

Qutb, a leading member of the Muslim Brotherhood movement,  is considered by some (Fawaz A. Gerges) to be "the founding father and leading theoretician" of modern jihadists, such as Osama bin Laden. He was executed for allegedly participating in a presidential assassination plot in 1966.

Maududi's political ideas influenced Sayyid Qutb. Like Maududi, he believed Sharia was crucial to Islam, so the restoration of its full enforcement was vital to the world. Since Sharia had not been fully enforced for centuries, Islam had "been extinct for a few centuries". Qutb preached that Muslims must engage in a two-pronged attack of converting individuals through preaching Islam peacefully but also using "physical power and jihad". Force was necessary because  "those who have usurped the authority of God" would not give up their power without a fight.
Like Khomeini, whom he influenced he believed the West was engaged in a vicious centuries long war against Islam.

Ascendancy in international politics

Six-Day War (1967) 

The quick and decisive defeat of the  armies of several Arab states by one small non-Muslim country during the Six-Day War  constituted a pivotal event in the Arab Muslim world. The defeat along with economic stagnation in the defeated countries, was blamed on the secular Arab nationalism of the ruling regimes. A steep and steady decline in the popularity and credibility of secular, socialist and nationalist politics ensued. Ba'athism, Arab socialism, and Arab nationalism suffered, and different democratic and anti-democratic Islamist movements inspired by Maududi and Sayyid Qutb gained ground.

Iranian Revolution (1978–1979) 

The first modern "Islamist state" (with the possible exception of Zia's Pakistan) was established among the Shia of Iran. In a major shock to the rest of the world, Ayatollah Ruhollah Khomeini  overthrew the secular, oil-rich, well-armed,  pro-American  monarchy ruled by Shah Muhammad Reza Pahlavi.

Khomeini believed that complete imitation of the Prophet Mohammad and his successors such as Ali for the restoration of Sharia law was essential to Islam, but his vision was not for a peaceful, gradual transition. The secular, Westernizing Muslims were not misguided, but "agents" of the West serving Western interests, helping to "plunder" Muslim lands as part of a long-term conspiracy against Islam by Western governments.  It is the duty of Muslims to  "destroy"  "all traces" of any other sort of government other than true Islamic governance because these are "systems of unbelief".  "Troublesome" groups that cause "corruption in Muslim society," and damage "Islam and the Islamic state" will be eliminated just as The Prophet eliminated the Jews of Bani Qurayza.

Khomeini and his followers helped translate the works of Mawdudi and Qutb into Persian and were influenced by them, but their views differed from them and other Sunni scholars in that:
 As a Shia,  Khomeini looked to Ali ibn Abī Tālib and Husayn ibn Ali Imam, but not Caliphs Abu Bakr, Omar or Uthman.
 Khomeini talked not about restoring the Caliphate or Sunni Islamic democracy, but about establishing a state where the guardianship of the democratic or  the dictatorial political system was performed by Shia jurists (ulama) as the successors of Shia Imams until the Mahdi returns from occultation. His concept of velayat-e-faqih ("guardianship of the [Islamic] jurist"), held that the leading Shia Muslim cleric in society—which Khomeini's mass of followers believed and chose to be himself—should serve as the supervisor of the state in order to protect or "guard" Islam and Sharia law from "innovation" and "anti-Islamic laws" passed by dictators or democratic parliaments.

The revolution was influenced by Marxism through Islamist thought and also by writings that sought either to counter Marxism (Muhammad Baqir al-Sadr's work) or to integrate socialism and Islamism  (Ali Shariati's work). A strong wing of the revolutionary leadership was made up of leftists or "radical populists", such as Ali Akbar Mohtashami-Pur.

Support for the Iranian revolution in the Muslim world has waxed and waned. Initially enthusiasm was intense, and support in the Arab street for its anti-Zionism has been strong;
but  "purges, executions, and atrocities tarnished its image",   as have periodic and widespread  domestic unrest and protest.

The Islamic Republic has also maintained its hold on power in Iran in spite of US economic sanctions, and has created or assisted like-minded Shia terrorist groups in Iraq, Egypt, Syria, Jordan (SCIRI) and Lebanon (Hezbollah) (two Muslim countries that also have large Shiite populations).>

Grand Mosque seizure (1979) 

The strength of the Islamist movement was manifest in an event which might have seemed sure to turn Muslim public opinion against fundamentalism, but did just the opposite. In 1979 the Grand Mosque in Mecca Saudi Arabia was seized by an armed fundamentalist group and held for over a week. Scores were killed, including many pilgrim bystanders in a gross violation of one of the most holy sites in Islam (and one where arms and violence are strictly forbidden).

Instead of prompting a backlash against the movement from which the attackers originated, however, Saudi Arabia, already very conservative, responded by shoring up its fundamentalist credentials with even more Islamic restrictions. Crackdowns followed on everything from shopkeepers who did not close for prayer and newspapers that published pictures of women, to the selling of dolls, teddy bears (images of animate objects are considered haraam), and dog food (dogs are considered unclean).

In other Muslim countries, blame for and wrath against the seizure was directed not against fundamentalists, but against Islamic fundamentalism's foremost geopolitical enemy—the United States. Ayatollah Khomeini sparked attacks on American embassies when he announced: "It is not beyond guessing that this is the work of criminal American imperialism and international Zionism", despite the fact that the object of the fundamentalists' revolt was the Kingdom of Saudi Arabia, America's major ally in the region. Anti-American demonstrations followed in the Philippines, Turkey, Bangladesh, India, the UAE, Pakistan, and Kuwait. The US Embassy in Libya was burned by protesters chanting pro-Khomeini slogans and the embassy in Islamabad, Pakistan was burned to the ground.

Soviet invasion of Afghanistan (1979–1989) 
In 1979, the Soviet Union deployed its 40th Army into Afghanistan, attempting to suppress an Islamic rebellion against an allied Marxist regime in the Afghan Civil War. The conflict, pitting indigenous impoverished Muslims (mujahideen) against an anti-religious superpower, galvanized thousands of Muslims around the world to send aid and sometimes to go themselves to fight for their faith. Leading this pan-Islamic effort was Palestinian sheikh Abdullah Yusuf Azzam. While the military effectiveness of these "Afghan Arabs" was marginal, an estimated 16,000 to 35,000 Muslim volunteers came from around the world to fight in Afghanistan.

When the Soviet Union abandoned the Marxist Najibullah regime and withdrew from Afghanistan in 1989 (the regime finally fell in 1992), the victory was seen by many Muslims as the triumph of Islamic faith over superior military power and technology that could be duplicated elsewhere.

The jihadists gained legitimacy and prestige from their triumph both within the militant community and among ordinary Muslims, as well as the confidence to carry their jihad to other countries where they believed Muslims required assistance.

The collapse of the Soviet Union itself, in 1991, was seen by many Islamists, including Bin Laden, as the defeat of a superpower at the hands of Islam. Concerning the $6 billion in aid given by the US and Pakistan's military training and intelligence support to the mujahideen, bin Laden wrote: "[T]he US has no mentionable role" in "the collapse of the Soviet Union... rather the credit goes to God and the mujahidin" of Afghanistan.

Persian Gulf War (1990–1991) 
Another factor in the early 1990s that worked to radicalize the Islamist movement was the Gulf War, which brought several hundred thousand US and allied non-Muslim military personnel to Saudi Arabian soil to put an end to Saddam Hussein's occupation of Kuwait. Prior to 1990 Saudi Arabia played an important role in restraining the many Islamist groups that received its aid. But when Saddam, secularist and Ba'athist dictator of neighboring Iraq, attacked Kuwait (his enemy in the war), western troops came to protect the Saudi monarchy. Islamists accused the Saudi regime of being a puppet of the west.

These attacks resonated with conservative Muslims and the problem did not go away with Saddam's defeat either, since American troops remained stationed in the kingdom, and a de facto cooperation with the Palestinian-Israeli peace process developed. Saudi Arabia attempted to compensate for its loss of prestige among these groups by repressing those domestic Islamists who attacked it (bin Laden being a prime example), and increasing aid to Islamic groups (Islamist madrassas around the world and even aiding some violent Islamist groups) that did not, but its pre-war influence on behalf of moderation was greatly reduced.  One result of this was a campaign of attacks on government officials and tourists in Egypt, a bloody civil war in Algeria and Osama bin Laden's terror attacks climaxing in the 9/11 attack.

2000s 
By the beginning of the twenty first century, "the word secular, a label proudly worn" in the 1960s and 70s was "shunned" and "used to besmirch" political foes in Egypt and the rest of the Muslim world. Islamists surpassed the small secular opposition parties in terms of "doggedness, courage," "risk-taking" or "organizational skills". As of 2002,
In the Middle East and Pakistan, religious discourse dominates societies, the airwaves, and thinking about the world. Radical mosques have proliferated throughout Egypt. Book stores are dominated by works with religious themes ... The demand for sharia, the belief that their governments are unfaithful to Islam and that Islam is the answer to all problems, and the certainty that the West has declared war on Islam; these are the themes that dominate public discussion. Islamists may not control parliaments or government palaces, but they have occupied the popular imagination.

Opinion polls in a variety of Islamic countries showed that significant majorities opposed groups like ISIS, but also wanted religion to play a greater role in public life.

"Post-Islamism" 
By 2020, approximately 40 years after the Islamic overthrow of the Shah of Iran  and the seizure of the Grand Mosque by extremists, a number of observers (Olivier Roy, Mustafa Akyol, Nader Hashemi) detected a decline in the vigor and popularity of Islamism.  Islamism had been an idealized/utopian  concept to compare with the grim reality of the status quo, but in more than four decades it had failed to establish a "concrete and viable blueprint for society" despite repeated efforts (Olivier Roy); and instead had left a less than inspiring track record of its impact on the world (Nader Hashemi). Consequently,
in addition to the trend towards moderation by Islamist or formerly Islamist parties (such as PKS of Indonesia, AKP of Turkey, and PAS of Malaysia) mentioned above,  there has been a social/religious and sometimes political backlash against Islamist rule in countries like Turkey, Iran, and Sudan (Mustafa Akyol).

Writing in 2020, Mustafa Akyol argues there has been a strong reaction by many Muslims against political Islam, including a weakening of religious faith—the very thing Islamism was intended to strengthen. He suggests this backlash against Islamism among Muslim youth has come from all the "terrible things" that have happened in the Arab world in the twenty first century "in the name of Islam"—such as the "sectarian civil wars in Syria, Iraq and Yemen".

Polls taken by Arab Barometer in six Arab countries — Algeria, Egypt, Tunisia, Jordan, Iraq and Libya — found "Arabs are losing faith in religious parties and leaders." In 2018–19, in all six countries, fewer than 20% of those asked whether they trusted Islamist parties answered in the affirmative. That percentage had fallen (in all six countries) from when the same question was asked in 2012–14. Mosque attendance also declined more than 10 points on average, and the share of those Arabs describing themselves as "not religious" went from 8% in 2013 to 13% in 2018–19. In Syria,  Sham al-Ali reports "Rising apostasy among Syrian youths".

Writing in 2021, Nader Hashemi notes that in  Iraq, Sudan, Tunisia, Egypt, Gaza, Jordan and other places were Islamist parties have come to power or campaigned to, "one general theme stands. The popular prestige of political Islam has been tarnished by its experience with state power."
In Iran, hardline Ayatollah Mohammad-Taqi Mesbah Yazdi has complained, “Iranians are evading religious teachings and turning to secularism.”
Even Islamist terrorism was in decline and tended "to be local" rather than pan-Islamic. As of 2021, Al-Qaeda consisted of "a bunch of militias" with no effective central command (Fareed Zakaria).

Rise of Islamism by country

Afghanistan (Taliban) 

In Afghanistan, the mujahideen's victory against the Soviet Union in the 1980s did not lead to justice and prosperity, due to a vicious and destructive civil war between political and tribal warlords, making Afghanistan one of the poorest countries on earth. In 1992, the Democratic Republic of Afghanistan ruled by communist forces collapsed, and democratic Islamist elements of mujahideen founded the Islamic State of Afghanistan. In 1996, a more conservative and anti-democratic Islamist movement known as the Taliban rose to power, defeated most of the warlords and took over roughly 80% of Afghanistan.

The Taliban were spawned by the thousands of madrasahs the Deobandi movement established for impoverished Afghan refugees and supported by governmental and religious groups in neighboring Pakistan. The Taliban differed from other Islamist movements to the point where they might be more properly described as Islamic fundamentalist or neofundamentalist, interested in spreading "an idealized and systematized version of conservative tribal village customs" under the label of Sharia to an entire country. Their ideology was also described as being influenced by Wahhabism, and the extremist jihadism of their guest Osama bin Laden.

The Taliban considered "politics" to be against Sharia and thus did not hold elections. They were led by Abdul Ghani Baradar and Mohammed Omar who was given the title "Amir al-Mu'minin" or Commander of the Faithful, and a pledge of loyalty by several hundred Taliban-selected Pashtun clergy in April 1996. Taliban were overwhelmingly Pashtun and were accused of not sharing power with the approximately 60% of Afghans who belonged to other ethnic groups. (see: Taliban#Ideology and aims)

The Taliban's hosting of Osama bin Laden led to an American-organized attack which drove them from power following the 9/11 attacks.
The Taliban continued to fight a vigorous insurgency with suicide bombings and armed attacks being launched against NATO and Afghan government targets. The Taliban re-established control of the country in 2021 following a 2020 peace agreement with the United States and the overthrow of the US-backed government.

Algeria 

In 1989, a broad Islamist coalition  movement was founded in Algeria known as the FIS or Front Islamique de Salut (the Islamic Salvation Front). 
Led by Abbassi Madani, and a charismatic Islamist young preacher, Ali Belhadj,  it was influenced by Salafism and the jihad in Afghanistan, as well as the Muslim Brotherhood.  Taking advantage of economic failure and unpopular social liberalization and secularization of the ruling leftist-nationalist FLN government, it used its preaching to advocate the establishment of a legal system following Sharia law, economic liberalization and development program, education in Arabic rather than French, and gender segregation, with women staying home to alleviate the high rate of unemployment among young Algerian men. The FIS won sweeping victories in local elections and was set  to win national elections in 1991, when voting was canceled by a military coup d'état.

As Islamists took up arms to overthrow the government, the FIS's leaders were arrested and it became overshadowed by Islamist guerrilla groups, particularly the Islamic Salvation Army, MIA and Armed Islamic Group (or GIA). A bloody and devastating civil war ensued in which between 150,000 and 200,000 people were killed over the next decade.

The civil war was not a victory for Islamists. By 2002 the main guerrilla groups had either been destroyed or had surrendered. The popularity of Islamist parties has declined to the point that "the Islamist candidate, Abdallah Jaballah, came a distant third with 5% of the vote" in the 2004 presidential election.

Bangladesh 
Jamaat-e-Islami Bangladesh is the largest Islamist party in the country and supports the implementation of Sharia law and promotes the country's main right-wing politics. Since 2000, the main political opposition Bangladesh Nationalist Party (BNP) has been allied with it and another Islamic party, Islami Oikya Jote. Some of their leaders and supporters, including former ministers and MPs, have been hanged for alleged war crimes during Bangladesh's struggle for independence and speaking against the ruling Bangladesh Awami League.

Belgium 
In the 2012, the party named Islam had four candidates and they were elected in Molenbeek and Anderlecht. In 2018, they ran candidates in 28 municipalities. Its policies include schools must offer halal food and women must be able to wear a headscarf anywhere. Another of the Islam Party's goals is to separate men and women on public transportation. The party's president argues this policy will help protect women from sexual harassment.

Denmark 

The Islamist movements gradually grew since the 1990s. The first Islamist groups and networks were predominantly influenced by the countries they immigrated from. Those involved had close contact with militant Islamists in the Middle East, South Asia and North Africa. Their operations had supporting militant groups financially as their first priority. Since the 1990s, people from the Islamist movements joined several conflicts to train with or participate in fighting with Islamist militants.

In the 2000s the Islamist movements grew and by 2014 there were militants among the Islamist movements in Copenhagen, Aarhus and Odense. Several people from crime gangs join Islamist movements that sympathise with militant Islamism. The militant Islamist movement were estimated to encompass some hundreds in 2014.

The Danish National Centre for Social Research released a report commissioned by the Ministry of Children, Integration and Social Affairs documenting 15 extremist groups operating in Denmark. Most  were non-Muslim far-right or far-left groups, but five were Sunni Islamist groups. These Sunni Islamist groups include Hizb ut-Tahrir Denmark, Dawah-bærere (Dawah Carriers), Kaldet til Islam (The Call to Islam), Dawah-centret (The Dawah Centre), and the Muslimsk Ungdomscenter (The Muslim Youth Centre). All of these Sunni Islamist groups operate in Greater Copenhagen with the exception of Muslimsk Ungdomscenter, which operates in Aarhus. Altogether, roughly 195 to 415 Muslims belong to one of these organizations and most are young men.

Egypt (Jihadism) 

While Qutb's ideas became increasingly radical during his imprisonment prior to his execution in 1966, the leadership of the Brotherhood, led by Hasan al-Hudaybi, remained moderate and interested in political negotiation and activism. Fringe or splinter movements inspired by the final writings of Qutb in the mid-1960s (particularly the manifesto Milestones, a.k.a. Ma'alim fi-l-Tariq) did, however, develop and they pursued a more radical direction. By the 1970s, the Brotherhood had renounced violence as a means of achieving its goals.

The path of violence and military struggle was then taken up by the Egyptian Islamic Jihad organization responsible for the assassination of Anwar Sadat in 1981. Unlike earlier anti-colonial movements the extremist group directed its attacks against what it believed were "apostate" leaders of Muslim states, leaders who held secular leanings or who had introduced or promoted Western/foreign ideas and practices into Islamic societies. Its views were outlined in a pamphlet written by Muhammad Abd al-Salaam Farag, in which he states:
...there is no doubt that the first battlefield for jihad is the extermination of these infidel leaders and to replace them by a complete Islamic Order...

Another of the Egyptian groups which employed violence in their struggle for Islamic order was  al-Gama'a al-Islamiyya (Islamic Group). Victims of their campaign against the Egyptian state in the 1990s included the head of the counter-terrorism police (Major General Raouf Khayrat), a parliamentary speaker (Rifaat al-Mahgoub), dozens of European tourists and Egyptian bystanders, and over 100 Egyptian police.  Ultimately the campaign to overthrow the government was unsuccessful, and the major jihadi group, Jamaa Islamiya (or al-Gama'a al-Islamiyya), renounced violence in 2003. Other lesser known groups include the Islamic Liberation Party, Salvation from Hell and Takfir wal-Hijra, and these groups have variously been involved in activities such as attempted assassinations of political figures, arson of video shops and attempted takeovers of government buildings.

France 
The Democratic Union of Muslims (French: , UDMF), a party founded in 2012, planned to take part in 2019 municipal elections. They presented candidate lists for 50 different cities. The UDMF also fielded candidates for European Parliament elections. The rise of the party can be attributed to French Muslim dissatisfaction with mainstream political parties.

Gérald Darmanin, Minister of the Interior of France, said in his book, Le séparatisme Islamiste, ‘Islamism, the most powerful ideology in the world, has deprived Islam of its voice.’

Law against Islamist extremism

Muslim Brotherhood in France

Gaza (Hamas) 

Hamas is a Palestinian Sunni Islamist organization that governs the Gaza Strip where it has moved to establish sharia law in matters such as separation of the genders, using the lash for punishment, and Islamic dress code.
Hamas also has a military resistance wing, the Izz ad-Din al-Qassam Brigades.

For some decades prior to the First Palestine Intifada in 1987, the Muslim Brotherhood in Palestine took a "quiescent" stance towards Israel, focusing on preaching, education and social services, and benefiting from Israel's "indulgence" to build up a network of mosques and charitable organizations. As the First Intifada gathered momentum and Palestinian shopkeepers closed their shops in support of the uprising, the Brotherhood announced the formation of HAMAS ("zeal"), devoted to Jihad against Israel.  Rather than being more moderate than the PLO, the 1988 Hamas charter took a more uncompromising stand, calling  for the destruction of Israel and the establishment of an Islamic state in Palestine. It was soon competing with and then overtaking the PLO for control of the intifada. The Brotherhood's base of devout middle class found common cause with the impoverished youth of the intifada in their cultural conservatism and antipathy for activities of the secular middle class such as drinking alcohol and going about without hijab.

Hamas has continued to play a significant role in the Israeli-Palestinian conflict. From 2000 to 2007 it killed 542 people in 140 suicide bombing or "martyrdom operations". In the January 2006 legislative election—its first foray into the political process—it won the majority of the seats, and in 2007 it drove the PLO out of Gaza. Hamas has been praised by Muslims for driving Israel out of the Gaza Strip, but criticized for failure to achieve its demands in the 2008–09 and 2014 Gaza Wars despite heavy destruction and significant loss of life.

Iraq and Syria (Islamic State)

Pakistan 

Early in the history of the state of Pakistan (12 March 1949), a parliamentary resolution (the Objectives Resolution) was adopted in accordance with the vision of founding fathers of Pakistan (Muhammad Iqbal, Muhammad Ali Jinnah, Liaquat Ali Khan), proclaiming:

This resolution later became a key source of inspiration for writers of the Constitution of Pakistan, and is included in the constitution as preamble.

In July 1977, General Zia-ul-Haq overthrew Prime Minister Zulfiqar Ali Bhutto's regime in Pakistan. Ali Bhutto, a leftist in democratic competition with Islamists, had announced banning alcohol and nightclubs within six months, shortly before he was overthrown. Zia-ul-Haq was much more committed to Islamism, and "Islamization" or implementation of Islamic law, became a cornerstone of his eleven-year military dictatorship and Islamism became his "official state ideology". Zia ul Haq was an admirer of Mawdudi and Mawdudi's party Jamaat-e-Islami became the "regime's ideological and political arm". In Pakistan this Islamization from above was "probably" more complete "than under any other regime except those in Iran and Sudan," but Zia-ul-Haq was also criticized by many Islamists for imposing "symbols" rather than substance, and using Islamization to legitimize his means of seizing power. Unlike neighboring Iran, Zia-ul-Haq's policies were intended to "avoid revolutionary excess", and not to strain relations with his American and Persian Gulf state allies. Zia-ul-Haq was killed in 1988 but Islamization remains an important element in Pakistani society.

Sudan 

For many years, Sudan had an Islamist regime under the leadership of Hassan al-Turabi. His National Islamic Front first gained influence when strongman General Gaafar al-Nimeiry invited members to serve in his government in 1979. Turabi built a powerful economic base with money from foreign Islamist banking systems, especially those linked with Saudi Arabia. He also recruited and built a cadre of influential loyalists by placing sympathetic students in the university and military academy while serving as minister of education.

After al-Nimeiry was overthrown in 1985 the party did poorly in national elections, but in 1989 it was able to overthrow the elected post-al-Nimeiry government with the help of the military. Turabi was noted for proclaiming his support for the democratic process and a liberal government before coming to power, but strict application of sharia law, torture and mass imprisonment of the opposition, and an intensification of the long-running war in southern Sudan, once in power. The NIF regime also harbored Osama bin Laden for a time (before 9/11), and worked to unify Islamist opposition to the American attack on Iraq in the 1991 Gulf War.

After Sudanese intelligence services were implicated in an assassination attempt on the President of Egypt, UN economic sanctions were imposed on Sudan, a poor country, and Turabi fell from favor. He was imprisoned for a time in 2004–05. Some of the NIF policies, such as the war with the non-Muslim south, have been reversed, though the National Islamic Front still holds considerable power in the government of Omar al-Bashir and National Congress Party, another Islamist party in country.

Switzerland 
Switzerland is not normally seen as a center of Islamism, especially when compared to countries such as Belgium or France. However, from 2012 to 2018, the majority of the country's jihadist and would-be jihadist population were radicalized in Switzerland.

Turkey 

Turkey had a number of Islamist parties, often changing names as they were banned by the constitutional court for anti-secular activities.  Necmettin Erbakan (1926–2011) was the leader of several of the parties, the National Order Party (Milli Nizam Partisi, 1970–1971), the National Salvation Party (Milli Selamet Partisi, 1972–1981), and the Welfare Party (Refah Partisi, 1983–1998); he also became a member of the Felicity Party (Saadet Partisi, 2003–2011). Current Turkish President Recep Tayyip Erdoğan has long been considered a champion of political Islam. The Justice and Development Party (AKP), which has dominated Turkish politics since 2002, is sometimes described as Islamist, but rejects such classification.

Contemporary era

By country
 Various Islamist political groups are dominant forces in the political systems of Afghanistan, Iran and Iraq.
 The Green Algeria Alliance is an Islamist coalition of political parties, created for the legislative election of 2012 in Algeria. It includes the Movement of Society for Peace (Hamas), Islamic Renaissance Movement (Ennahda) and the Movement for National Reform (Islah). The alliance is led by Bouguerra Soltani of Hamas. However, the incumbent coalition, comprising the FLN of President Abdelaziz Bouteflika and the RND of Prime Minister Ahmed Ouyahia, held on to power after winning a majority of seats, and the Islamist parties of the Green Algeria Alliance lost seats in the legislative election of 2012.
 Shia Islamist Al Wefaq, Salafi Islamist Al Asalah and Ikhwani(brotherhood) Islamist Al-Menbar Islamic Society are dominant democratic forces in Bahrain.
 In Indonesia, Prosperous Justice Party is the major Islamist political party in the country's democratic process.
 Islamic Action Front is Jordan's Islamist political party and largest democratic political force in the country. The IAF's survival in Jordan is primarily due to its flexibility and less radical approach to politics.
 Hadas or "Islamic Constitutional Movement" is Kuwait's Sunni Islamist party.
 Islamic Group (Lebanon) is a Sunni Islamist political party in Lebanon. Hezbollah is a Shia Islamist political party in Lebanon.
 The Justice and Construction Party is the Muslim Brotherhood's political arm in Libya and the second largest political force in the country. The National Forces Alliance, the largest political group in country, does not believe the country should be run entirely by Sharia law or secular law, but does hold that Sharia should be "the main inspiration for legislation." Party leader Jibril has said the NFA is a moderate Islamic movement that recognises the importance of Islam in political life and favours Sharia as the basis of the law.
 The Pan-Malaysian Islamic Party is a major opposition party in Malaysia which espouses Islamism.
 The Justice and Development Party (Morocco) is the ruling party in Morocco since 29 November 2011, advocating Islamism and Islamic democracy.
 The Muslim Brotherhood of Syria is a Sunni Islamist force in Syria and very loosely affiliated to the Egyptian Muslim Brotherhood. It has also been called the "dominant group" or "dominant force" in the Arab Spring uprising in Syria. The group's stated political positions are moderate and in its most recent April 2012 manifesto it "pledges to respect individual rights", to promote pluralism and democracy.
 The Islamic Renaissance Party of Tajikistan is Tajikistan's Islamist party and main opposition and democratic force in the country.
 The Ennahda Movement, also known as Renaissance Party or simply Ennahda, is a moderate Islamist political party in Tunisia. On 1 March 2011, after the government of Zine El Abidine Ben Ali collapsed in the wake of the 2011 Tunisian revolution, Tunisia's interim government granted the group permission to form a political party. Since then it has become the biggest and most well-organized party in Tunisia, so far outdistancing its more secular competitors. In the Tunisian Constituent Assembly election of 2011, the first honest election in the country's history with a turnout of 51% of all eligible voters, the party won 37% of the popular vote and 89 (41%) of the 217 assembly seats, far more than any other party.
 Eastern Africa has become a hotbed of violent Islamic extremism since the late 1990s, one of the relevant movements being al-Shabaab, based in Somalia, which emerged in response to the 2006–09 Ethiopian intervention in Somalia.
 West Africa has seen the rise of influential Islamic extremist organizations, notably Boko Haram in Northern Nigeria and al-Qaeda in the Islamic Maghreb in Mali.

Hizb ut-Tahrir

Hizb ut-Tahrir is an influential international Islamist movement, founded in 1953 by an Islamic Qadi (judge) Taqiuddin al-Nabhani. HT is unique from most other Islamist movements in that the party focuses not on implementation of Sharia on local level or on providing social services, but on unifying the Muslim world under its vision of a new Islamic caliphate spanning from North Africa and the Middle East to much of central and South Asia.

To this end it has drawn up and published a 186-article constitution for its proposed caliphate-state specifying specific policies such as sharia law, a "unitary ruling system" headed by a caliph elected by Muslims, an economy based on the gold standard, public ownership of utilities, public transport, and energy resources, death for apostates and Arabic as the "sole language of the State."

In its focus on the Caliphate, the party takes a different view of Muslim history than some other Islamists such as Muhammad Qutb. HT sees Islam's pivotal turning point as occurring not with the death of Ali, or one of the other four "rightly guided" caliphs in the 7th century, but with the abolition of the Ottoman Caliphate in 1924. This is believed to have ended the true Islamic system, something for which it blames "the disbelieving (Kafir) colonial powers" working through Turkish modernist Mustafa Kemal Atatürk.

HT does not engage in armed jihad or work for a democratic system, but works to take power through "ideological struggle" to change Muslim public opinion, and in particular through elites who will "facilitate" a "change of the government," i.e., launch a "bloodless" coup. It allegedly attempted and failed such coups in 1968 and 1969 in Jordan, and in 1974 in Egypt, and is now banned in both countries.

The party is sometimes described as "Leninist" and "rigidly controlled by its central leadership," with its estimated one million members required to spend "at least two years studying party literature under the guidance of mentors (Murshid)" before taking "the party oath." HT is particularly active in the ex-soviet republics of Central Asia and in Europe.

Post-Arab Spring (2011–present)

One observer (Quinn Mecham) notes four trends in Islamism rising from the Arab Spring of 2010–11:
 The repression of the Muslim Brotherhood. Primarily by the Egyptian military and courts following the forcible removal of Morsi from office in 2013; but also by Saudi Arabia and a number of Gulf countries (not Qatar).
 Rise of Islamist "state-building" where "state failure" has taken place—most prominently in Syria, Iraq, Libya and Yemen.  Islamists have found it easier than competing non-Islamists trying to fill the void of state failure, by securing external funding, weaponry and fighters—"many of which have come from abroad and have rallied around a pan-Islamic identity". The norms of governance in these Islamist areas are militia-based, and the population submit to their authority out of fear, loyalty, other reasons, or some combination. The "most expansive" of these new "models" is the Islamic State.
 Increasing sectarianism at least in part from proxy wars. Fighters are proxies primarily for Saudi Arabia and the Gulf states and for Iran. Islamists are fighting Islamists across sectarian lines in Lebanon (Sunni militants targeting Hezbollah positions), Yemen (between mainstream Sunni Islamists of Islah and the Shiite Zaydi Houthi movement), in Iraq (Islamic State and Iraqi Shiite militias)
 Increased caution and political learning in countries such as Algeria and Jordan where Islamist have chosen not to lead a major challenge against their governments. In Yemen Islah "has sought to frame its ideology in a way that will avoid charges of militancy".
Another observer (Tarek Osman) notes with concern that
 the failure to take power during the Arab Spring has led not to "soul-searching" in major Islamist groups about what went wrong, but instead to "antagonism and fiery anger" and a thirst for revenge. Partisans of political Islam (although this does not include some prominent leaders such as Rached Ghannouchi but is particularly true in Egypt) see themselves as victims of an injustice whose perpetrators are not just "individual conspirators but entire social groups".

Islamic State

"The Islamic State", formerly known as the "Islamic State of Iraq and the Levant" and before that the "Islamic State of Iraq", (also called by the Arabic acronym Daesh), is a Wahhabi/Salafi jihadist extremist militant group which is led by and mainly composed of Sunni Arabs from Syria and Iraq. In 2014, the group proclaimed itself a caliphate, with religious, political and military authority over all Muslims worldwide.
, it had control over territory occupied by ten million people in Syria and Iraq, and has nominal control over small areas of Libya, Nigeria, and Afghanistan. (While a self-described state, it lacks international recognition.) ISIL also operates or has affiliates in other parts of the world, including North Africa and South Asia

Originating as the Jama'at al-Tawhid wal-Jihad in 1999, ISIL pledged allegiance to al-Qaeda in 2004, participated in the Iraqi insurgency that followed the invasion of Iraq by Western coalition forces in 2003, joined the fight in the Syrian Civil War beginning in 2011, and was expelled from al-Qaeda in early 2014, (which complained of its failure to consult and "notorious intransigence"). ISIL gained prominence after it drove Iraqi government forces out of key cities in western Iraq in an offensive in June that same year.  The group is adept at social media, posting Internet videos of beheadings of soldiers, civilians, journalists and aid workers, and is known for its destruction of cultural heritage sites.
The United Nations (UN) has held ISIL responsible for human rights abuses and war crimes, and Amnesty International has reported ethnic cleansing by the group on a "historic scale". The group has been designated a terrorist organisation by the UN, the European Union (EU) and member states, the United States, India, Indonesia, Turkey, Saudi Arabia, Syria and other countries.

Islamism in the Shia World

Shīʿa Islam is the second largest branch of Islam, followed by 10–15% of all Muslims. Twelver Shīʿīsm is the largest branch of Shīʿa Islam, comprising about 85% of all Shīʿa Muslims.

Islamist Shi'ism is a minority denomination of Twelver Shi'ism which was influenced by the Sunni Muslim Brotherhood ideologies and it is also a politicized version of Ibn Arabi's mysticism. It sees Islam as a political system and it also differs from the other mainstream Usuli and Akhbari groups because it advocates the formation of an Islamist state before the end of the occultation of the twelfth Imam. Islamist Shi'ism took its shape during the Cold War and appeared on international stage after Iranian Revolution of 1979. It has been crucial in worldwide Islamism, since the Iranian regime decided to export its revolution. Although, the Islamist ideology was originally imported from Muslim Brotherhood, Iranian relations with Muslim Brotherhood has also deteriorated due to its involvement in the Syrian civil war. However, the majority Usuli Shi'ism rejects the idea of an Islamist State in the period of Occultation of the Hidden Imam.

The Inherent Secularity 

Occultation of Imam in Shia Islam refers to a belief that Mahdi, a cultivated male descendant of the Islamic Prophet Muhammad, has already been born and subsequently went into occultation, from which he will one day emerge with Jesus and establish global justice. During the first democratic revolution of Asia, the Iranian Constitutional Revolution, Shia Marja' Akhund Khurasani and his colleagues theorized a model of religious secularity in the absence of Imam, that still prevails in Shia seminaries. In absence of the ideal ruler, that is Imam al-Mahdi, democracy was the best available option. He considers opposition to constitutional democracy hostility towards the twelfth Imam because an Islamic system of governance can not be established without the leadership of the infallible Imam. Thus a democratic legislation can help reduce the state's tyranny and maintain peace and security. He said:

Because it is “sanctioned by sacred law and religion”, Akhund believes, a theocratic government can only be formed by the infallible Imam. Aqa Buzurg Tehrani also quoted Akhund Khurasani saying that if there was a possibility of establishment of a truly legitimate Islamic rule in any age, God must end occultation of the Imam of Age. Hence, he refuted the idea of absolute guardianship of jurist. Therefore, according to Akhund, Shia jurists must support the democratic reform. He prefers collective wisdom over individual opinions, and limits the role of jurist to provide religious guidance in personal affairs of a believer. He defines democracy as a system of governance that enforces a set of “limitations and conditions” on the head of state and government employees so that they work within “boundaries that the laws and religion of every nation determines”. Akhund believes that modern secular laws complement traditional religion. He asserts that both religious rulings and the laws outside the scope of religion confront “state despotism”. Constitutionalism is based on the idea of defending the “nation's inherent and natural liberties”, and as absolute power corrupts, a democratic distribution of power would make it possible for the nation to live up to its full potential.

The First Democratic Revolution of Asia 

The city of Najaf has played the role of nerve center in Shia world through centuries. In the 1900s, at the dawn of constitutional revolution, it was here that the political ideas were discussed and the religious secularity of Shia jurisprudence took shape. Many periodicals of the time, especially ‘al-Ghura’, ‘Durat al-Najaf’ and ‘Najaf’, published from the city, reflect the nature of the intellectual exchange during the movement.} Other publications, such as Calcutta based ‘Habl al-Matin’ also reached the residents of Najaf.} Najaf had developed its own taste of modernity, distinct from west. These publications advocated the concepts of personal liberty, nation-state, modern sciences, constitutional monarchy and democracy. But they also viewed western colonial advance as intimidating and understood that the only way to fight back was creating a strong and progressive nation.}

The fourth Qajar King, Naser al-Din Shah was assassinated by Mirza Reza Kermani, a follower of Jamāl al-Dīn al-Afghānī, when he was visiting and praying in the Shah Abdul-Azim Shrine on 1 May 1896. At Mozaffar al-Din Shah's accession Persia faced a financial crisis, with annual governmental expenditures far in excess of revenues as a result of the policies of his father. During his reign, Mozzafar ad-Din attempted some reforms of the central treasury; however, the previous debt incurred by the Qajar court, owed to both England and Russia, significantly undermined this effort. He awarded William Knox D'Arcy, a British subject, the rights to oil in most of the country in 1901. Widespread fears amongst the aristocracy, educated elites, and religious leaders about the concessions and foreign control resulted in some protests in 1906. The three main groups of the coalition seeking a constitution were the merchants, the ulama, and a small group of radical reformers. They shared the goal of ending royal corruption and ending dominance by foreign powers. These resulted in the Shah accepting a suggestion to create a Majles (National Consultative Assembly) in October 1906, by which the monarch's power was curtailed as he granted a constitution and parliament to the people. King Mozaffar ad-Din Shah signed the 1906 constitution shortly before his death. The members of newly formed parliament stayed constantly in touch with Akhund Khurasani and whenever legislative bills were discussed, he was telegraphed the details for a juristic opinion. In a letter dated June 3, 1907, the parliament told Akhund about a group of anti-constitutionalists who were trying to undermine legitimacy of democracy in the name of religious law. The trio replied:

The Cold War and the Usuli-Islamist Clash in the Shi'i World

During the cold war, a massive translation of Muslim Brotherhood thinkers started in Iran. The books of Sayyid Qutb and Abul A'la Al-Maududi were promoted through Muslim World League by Saudi patronage to confront communist propaganda in the Muslim world. The Shah regime in Iran tolerated the Muslim Brotherhood literature because not only it weakened the democratic Usulis but also, being in western camp, Shah understood that this was the main ideological response of West to penetrating Soviet communism in Muslim world. Soviet reports of the time indicate that Persian translations of this literature were smuggled to Afghanistan too, where western block intended to use Islamists against the communists. Khaled Abou el-Fadl thinks that Sayyid Qutb was inspired by the German fascist Carl Schmidt. He embodied a mixture of Wahhabism and Fascism and alongside Maududi, theorized the ideology of Islamism. The writings of Maududi and other Pakistani and Indian Islamists were translated into Persian and alongside the literature of Muslim Brotherhood, shaped the ideology of Shi'i Islamists.  Maududi appreciated the power of modern state and its coercive potential that could be used for moral policing. He saw Islam as a nation-state that sought to mould its citizens and control every private and public expression of their lives, like fascists and communist states. Iranian Shi'i Islamists had close links with Maududi's Jamaat-e-Islami, and after the 1963 riots in Qom, the Jamaat's periodical Tarjuman ul-Quran published a piece criticizing the Shah and supporting the Islamist currents in Iran.
Sayyid Qutb's works were translated by Iranian Islamists into Persian and enjoyed remarkable popularity both before and after the revolution. Prominent figures such as current Iranian Supreme Leader Ali Khamenei and his brother Muhammad Khamenei, Aḥmad Aram, Hadi Khosroshahi, etc. translated Qutb's works into Persian. Hadi Khosroshahi was the first person to identify himself as Akhwani Shia.  According to the National Library and Archives of Iran, 19 works of Sayyid Qutb and 17 works of his brother Muhammad Qutb were translated to Persian and widely circulated in 1960's. Reflecting on this import of ideas, Ali Khamenei said:

In 1984, the Iranian authorities honoured Sayyid Qutb by issuing a postage stamp which showed him behind bars during his trial.

But Ayatullah Hadi Milani, the influential Usuli Marja in Mashhad during the 1970s, had issued a fatwa prohibiting his followers from reading Ali Shariati's books and Islamist literature produced by young clerics. This fatwa was followed by similar fatwas from Ayatullah Mar'ashi Najafi, Ayatullah Muhammad Rouhani, Ayatullah Hasan Qomi and others. The Islamist Ayatullah Khomeini refused to comment. Ali Shariati, a bitter critic of traditional Usuli clergy, was also greatly influenced by anti-democratic Islamist ideas of Muslim Brotherhood thinkers in Egypt and he tried to meet Muhammad Qutb while visiting Saudi Arabia in 1969. Shariati criticized Ayatullah Hadi al-Milani and other Usuli Marja's for not being revolutionary. A chain smoker, Shariati died of a heart attack while in self-imposed exile in Southampton, on June 18, 1977.

However, in one of his first books, Kashf al-Asrar, the Islamist jurist, Ruhollah Khomeini had argued that:

Meanwhile, in Iraq, the Sunni dynasty of Hashemites founded by the British colonialism in 1921 fell after a successful military coup in 1958, led by the pro-soviet General Abd al-Karim Qasim. The religious learning centers came under immense pressure from the communist propaganda and government's attempts to curb religion as an obstacle to modernity and progress. Usuli Marja' Ayatollah Mohsin al-Hakim issued fatwa against communism. A young Islamist cleric, Muhammad Baqir al-Sadr started to produce Islamist literature and wrote books like Our Philosophy and Our Economy, and with some colleagues established the Islamic Dawa Party, with similar goals to that of Muslim Brotherhood, but left it after two years to focus on writing. Ayatullah Mohsin al-Hakim disapproved of his activities and ideas.

The Islamist Revolution

After his arrest in Iran following the 1963 riots, leading Ayatullahs had issued a statement that Ayatullah Khomeini was a legitimate Marja' too, which saved his life and he was exiled. While in exile in Iraq in the holy city of Najaf, Khomeini took advantage of the Iraq-Iran conflict and launched a campaign against the Pahlavi regime in Iran. Saddam Hussein gave him access to the Persian broadcast of Radio Baghdad to address Iranians and made it easier for him to receive visitors. He gave a series of 19 lectures to a group of his students from January 21 to February 8, 1970, on Islamic Government, and elevated Naraqi's idea of Jurist's absolute authority over imitator's personal life to all aspects of social life. Notes of the lectures were soon made into a book that appeared under three different titles: The Islamic Government, Authority of the Jurist, and A Letter from Imam Musavi Kashef al-Gita (to deceive Iranian censors).  Khomeini The small book (fewer than 150 pages) was smuggled into Iran and "widely distributed" to Khomeini supporters before the revolution. The response from high-level Shi'a clerics to his idea of absolute guardianship of jurist was negative. Grand Ayatollah Abul-Qassim Khoei, the leading Shia ayatollah at the time the book was published rejected Khomeini's argument on the grounds that the authority of jurist is limited to the guardianship of orphans and social welfare and could not be extended to the political sphere. Al-Khoei elaborates on the role of a well-qualified Shia Jurist in the age of occultation of the Infallible Imam, which has been traditionally endorsed by the Usuli Shia scholars, as follows:

Ayatullah Khoei showed great flexibility and tolerance, for example he considered non-Muslims as equal citizens of the nation-state, stopped the harsh punishments like stoning and favored the use of holy books other than Quran for oaths taken from non-Muslims.
In Isfahan, Ayatullah Khoei's representative Syed Abul Hasan Shamsabadi gave sermons criticizing the Islamist interpretation of Shi'i theology, he was abducted and killed by the Islamist underground group called Target Killers headed by Mehdi Hashmi. At Qom, the major Marja' Mohammad Kazem Shariatmadari was at odds with Khomeini's interpretation of the concept of the "Leadership of Jurists" (Wilayat al-faqih). Shariatmadari strongly believed that no system of government can be coerced upon a people, no matter how morally correct it may be. Instead, people need to be able to freely elect a government. Before the Islamist revolution of 1979, Shariatmadari wanted a return to the system of constitutional monarchy that was enacted in the Iranian Constitution of 1906. He encouraged peaceful demonstrations to avoid bloodshed.  

On 6 January 1978, an article appeared in the daily Ettela'at newspaper, insulting Ayatullah Khomeini. Frustrated youth in Qom took to the streets, six were killed. On 40th day of deaths in Qom, Tabriz saw uprising and death. The chain-reaction started and led to uprisings in all cities. Seizing the moment, Khomeini gave an interview to the French newspaper Le Monde and demanded that the regime should be overthrown. He started giving interviews to western media in which he appeared as a changed man, spoke of a ‘progressive islam’ and did not mention the idea of ‘guardianship of the jurist’. On 10th and 11 December 1978, the days of Tasu'a and Ashura, millions marched on the streets of Tehran, chanting ‘Death to Shah’. On 16 January 1979, Shah fled the country.
After the success of the 1979 Islamic Revolution, the major Iranian Usuli Marja' Mohammad Kazem Shariatmadari criticized Khomeini's system of government as not being compatible with Islam or representing the will of the Iranian people. He severely criticized the way in which a referendum was conducted to establish Khomeini's system of government. In response, Khomeini put him under house arrest and imprison his family members. This resulted in mass protests in Tabriz which were quashed toward the end of January 1980, when under the orders of Khomeini tanks and the army moved into the city.

Response

Criticism

Counter-response
The U.S. government has engaged in efforts to counter militant Islamism (Jihadism), since 2001. These efforts were centred in the U.S. around public diplomacy programmes conducted by the State Department. There have been calls to create an independent agency in the U.S. with a specific mission of undermining Jihadism. Christian Whiton, an official in the George W. Bush administration, called for a new agency focused on the nonviolent practice of "political warfare" aimed at undermining the ideology. U.S. Defense Secretary Robert Gates called for establishing something similar to the defunct U.S. Information Agency, which was charged with undermining the communist ideology during the Cold War.

Parties and organizations

See also

References

Notes

Citations

Sources

Further reading

 
 
 
 
 
 
 
 
 
 
 
 
 
 
Valentine, Simon Ross, Force and Fanaticism: Wahhabism in Saudi Arabia and Beyond, (2015), London/New York, Hurst & Co.
 
 
 
 

Bayat, Mangol (1991). “Iran's First Revolution: Shi'ism and the Constitutional Revolution of 1905-1909”. Studies in Middle Eastern History. Oxford, New York: Oxford University Press. ISBN 978-0-19-506822-1.

External links 

 
 

 
Islam-related controversies
Political ideologies